The Killing Joke is a novel written by Anthony Horowitz, first published in 2004 by The Orion Publishing Group. It is a comedy thriller about a man called Guy Fletcher, who tries to track down the source of a joke.

Plot summary
Guy Fletcher is an actor who overhears a builder telling a joke in his local pub about his mother (although very few people know that he is her son), a famous and much loved actress called Selina Moore, who died in a plane accident in France. The joke was "Why is Selina Moore like Ferrero Rocher? Because they both came out of France in a box." This was originally a real joke about Princess Diana's death, a fact which is mentioned in the book.

The next day he wonders where jokes come from and, despite being discouraged by his agent Sylvie, goes on a mission to track down the joke. On the way, he  meets a variety of people, most importantly a woman called Sally, with whom he falls in love. After investigating various dead-ends and multiple paths that the joke has followed, he is noticed by a mysterious company, led by a man called Rupert Liddy, who has a perfect memory. This company then attempt to stop Guy by using characters from jokes (e.g. an Englishman, Irishman and Scotsman), and stereotypes of character groups. Eventually, they frame him for his neighbor's murder, at which point Guy goes into hiding.

He goes back to Sally, believing her to be the last chance he has of finding out what was going on. However, when he gets there, her house is blown up. Sally herself is not in, but her mother, who has elephantiasis, is. Sally decides to go with Guy to track down the joke. His only lead is a company called Sphinx, that apparently create vacuum cleaners, as that was where he ended one of the trails of the joke. He tries to track down Sphinx, but cannot, and when he rings their number is left holding for an hour, before being redirected.

At another attempt, he plots where he traced the joke on a map with three of the trails that he followed, and found they crossed near the coast of Suffolk. They travel there, stopping in an abandoned fairground overnight to sleep, and end up having sex. After investigating various towns in the area, they stop at a village called Kelford. As they investigate, they find that everyone there is almost completely humourless, and that it has something to do with a small island just off the coast. At night, they steal a boat and travel there. They soon get captured and brought to speak with Rupert Liddy. He puts them in cells and, during a long speech about jokes, what makes a joke funny, and why they are essential, reveals that Sphinx are set up to create and distribute jokes so that people do not take things, like politics, too seriously. He also explains that their identity must be kept secret because if someone found out that jokes were created by a company, people wouldn't find them funny any more.

Rupert then tortures Guy, to find out who sent him and who else knows he is there, by tickling his foot with a feather. He then places Guy and Sally in a cell together that fills up with poisonous gas. There is a light bulb in the room that is switched on, and turns off when there is a fatal level of gas in the room. Guy and Sally breathe in the gas and go unconscious.

They then wake up on a small boat, and knock the captain unconscious. It is revealed that the light bulb in the gas chamber was broken, turning off too early, and so the gas had been turned off before it became fatal. The light bulb had not been repaired by maintenance because they were short staffed, causing Mr. Liddy to shout out the punchline of the book 'How many top-secret government technicians does it take to change a light bulb?'

In the penultimate chapter of the book, it clumsily describes how Guy and Sally went to France and started a new life, written as if being spoken by someone who is badly describing a joke. At the end, when this mystery narrator has realised he has ruined the joke, they decide to start again, and the final words are the same as the first ones.

Critical reception
Denise Pickles of Reviewing the Evidence said while The Killing Joke was sometimes confusing, the book altogether was interesting.

References

2004 British novels
Novels by Anthony Horowitz
Novels set in Suffolk
Orion Books books